Uranotaenia (Uranotaenia) rutherfordi is a species of zoophilic mosquito belonging to the genus Uranotaenia. It is endemic to Sri Lanka, and first documented from Peradeniya.

References

External links
Notes on the Genus Uranotaenia

rutherfordi
Insects described in 1922